Rebecca McDowell "Bekki" Cook (July 18, 1950) is an American politician from Missouri, United States. She served as the 36th Missouri Secretary of State from December 1994 to January 2001.

Cook was raised in Jackson, Missouri, and attended public schools.  She graduated from the University of Missouri in 1972 with a degree in political science.  She received her J.D. degree from the University of Missouri in 1975 and practiced law in Cape Girardeau.

While working in private law practice, Cook was appointed to the Missouri State Board of Education by Governor John Ashcroft.  She was subsequently re-appointed by Governor Mel Carnahan.  In December 1994, Carnahan appointed Cook as Missouri's Secretary of State.  Cook succeeded Judi Moriarty who had been impeached and removed from office following a scandal.

In 1996, Cook was elected to a full term as Secretary of State.  She chose not to seek re-election in 2000.  In 2004, Cook ran for Lieutenant Governor of Missouri and won a contested primary to become the Democratic nominee.  However, she was defeated by less than 1% of the vote in the general election by Republican Peter Kinder who is also from Cape Girardeau County, Missouri.

Personal life
Cook is married to Cape Girardeau attorney John Larkin Cook.  They have two children.

References

1950 births
Living people
Secretaries of State of Missouri
School board members in Missouri
People from Cape Girardeau County, Missouri
University of Missouri alumni
Women in Missouri politics
Missouri Democrats
20th-century American politicians
21st-century American politicians
Candidates in the 2004 United States elections
21st-century American women politicians
20th-century American women politicians